Ben Robert Mason (born May 25, 1999) is an American football fullback for the Baltimore Ravens of the National Football League (NFL). He played college football at Michigan and was drafted by the Baltimore Ravens in the fifth round of the 2021 NFL Draft.

Early life and high school
Mason was born in Framingham Massachusetts and later moved to Newtown, Connecticut and attended Newtown High School. Mason was named the Connecticut Gatorade Football Player of the Year after rushing for 719 yards and 11 touchdowns with 15 receptions for 188 yards and three touchdowns on offense and recording 63 tackles with two interceptions and two forced fumbles on defense.

College career
Mason played in every game of his freshman season at Michigan on special teams and also rushed for two touchdowns as a fullback. As a sophomore, he saw significant playing time as a fullback and rushed for 80 yards and seven touchdowns on 33 carries with one reception for 15 yards and seven tackles on special teams. He scored three touchdowns in Michigan's 56-10 win over Nebraska to begin conference play. Mason was moved to the defensive tackle position during spring practices and began his junior year as a starter. He was moved back to fullback and tight end one month into the season and was used primarily as a blocker. Mason caught two passes for 17 yards and one touchdown as a senior.

Professional career

Baltimore Ravens
Mason was selected in the fifth round with the 184th overall pick of the 2021 NFL Draft by the Baltimore Ravens. On May 12, 2021, Mason signed with the Ravens. He was waived on August 31, 2021.

New England Patriots
On September 1, 2021, the New England Patriots signed Mason to their practice squad. He was released on November 8, 2021.

Chicago Bears
On December 7, 2021, the Chicago Bears signed Mason to their practice squad.

Baltimore Ravens (second stint)
On January 21, 2022, Mason signed a reserve/future contract with the Ravens. He was waived on August 30, 2022 and signed to the practice squad the next day. He signed a reserve/future contract on January 18, 2023.

References

External links
Michigan Wolverines bio

1999 births
Living people
American football fullbacks
American football tight ends
Michigan Wolverines football players
People from Newtown, Connecticut
Players of American football from Connecticut
Sportspeople from Fairfield County, Connecticut
Baltimore Ravens players
New England Patriots players
Chicago Bears players